Matthew Griffin is an American writer. His debut novel Hide won the Crook's Corner Book Prize in 2017, and was a shortlisted nominee for the Lambda Literary Award for Gay Fiction at the 29th Lambda Literary Awards.

Originally from Greensboro, North Carolina, he is currently a creative writing teacher at the University of Louisiana at Lafayette. His husband, Raymie Wolfe, is a musician; the couple were profiled in a 2013 New York Times series on the struggle for LGBT rights in the Southern United States, as well as a follow-up piece about the changing landscape after the Obergefell v. Hodges decision that legalized same-sex marriage in the United States.

References

21st-century American novelists
American male novelists
American LGBT novelists
American gay writers
People from Greensboro, North Carolina
Novelists from North Carolina
University of Louisiana at Lafayette faculty
Living people
Year of birth missing (living people)
21st-century American male writers
Novelists from Louisiana